Gankhak or Gonkhak may refer to:
 Gankhak-e Kowra
 Gankhak-e Raisi
 Gankhak-e Sheykhi